Vatreni Poljubac  (trans. "Fiery Kiss") is a Bosnian and Yugoslav hard rock / heavy metal band, formed in 1977 by composer, lyricist, vocalist and guitarist Milić Vukašinović. The band is widely considered to be regional pioneers of the heavy metal genre and one of the most important rock bands of Sarajevo and former Yugoslavia pop-rock scene. In almost 40 years since its founding, the band has released 9 studio albums, the latest being 2011 reunion release Kad svira rock 'n' roll, two singles and several compilation albums.

History
Vatreni Poljubac was formed in 1977 in Sarajevo by a former Kodeksi, Indexi and Bijelo Dugme member Milić Vukašinović (guitar and vocals). The other two members of the original line-up were former Divlje Jagode member Šefćet Hodža (bass) and Indexi member Perica Stojanović (drums). They released their first single in 1978 for Jugoton with the songs  "Doktor za rock and roll" and "Tvoje usne su bile moj najdraži dar". The first single album received immediate critical acclaim and popularized Vatreni Poljubac and their song  "Doktor za rock n' roll" in former Yugoslavia. The first album named "Oh, što te volim joj" was recorded 1978 in London and Sarajevo for Sarajevo disk, and produced by Richard Whally. Album featured a number of songs inspired by the pioneering sound that was coming out of England at the time epitomized by acts like Led Zeppelin and Black Sabbath.

Vatreni Poljubac original line-up recorded its last studio album "100% Rock and Roll" in 1986 with former Bijelo Dugme member Mladen Vojičić Tifa, one of the most popular singers at the time in Yugoslavia. All songs written and composed by Milić Vukašinović. Album has achieved great reviews and became very popular throughout the country, after which Vukašinović disbanded the band and devoted himself to his solo career as folk-rock singer.

Discography

Studio albums
Oh, što te volim joj (1978)
Recept za Rock 'n' Roll (1979)
To je ono pravo (1980)
Bez dlake na jeziku (1980)
Živio Rock 'n' Roll (1982)
Iz inata (1985)
100% Rock and Roll (1986)
Sve ce jednom proć' samo nece nikad Rock 'n' Roll (1999)
Kad svira rock 'n' roll (2011)

Singles
Doktor za Rock 'n' Roll / Tvoje usne su bile moj najdraži dar (1978)
Na vrat na nos i na svoju ruku / Od želje da te ljubim hoću prosto da poludim (1979)

Compilations
Veliki Hitovi (1983, ZKP RTVL)
Dr. Za Rock 'N Roll (1997, Nimfa Sound)
100% Rock and Roll (1997, Nimfa Sound)
Najveći Hitovi (2000, Goraton)

Members
 Milić Vukašinović – vocal, guitar (1977–1986, 1998–2001, 2006, 2010–present) 
 Perica Stojanović – drums (1977–1986, 2006) 
 Shefqet (sheki) Hoxha – bass guitar (1977–1980)
 Sanin Karić – bass guitar (1980–1986, 2006) 
 Velibor Rajačić – drums (1985–1986) 
 Nedžib "Neno" Jeleč – bass guitar (1985–1986, died 5 November 2017) 
 Mladen Vojičić – vocal (1986) 
 Marko Nikolić – bass guitar (1998–2001)
 Dušan Obradović – drums (1998–2001) 
 Dejan Nikolić – drums (2006)
 Srđan Đukić – bass guitar (2011–present)
 Vladimir Čopić – drums (2011–present)

References

External links
 Vatreni Poljubac at Discogs

Bosnia and Herzegovina musical groups
Yugoslav hard rock musical groups
Yugoslav heavy metal musical groups
Musical groups established in 1977